The Adventures of Mr. Maximillian Bacchus and His Travelling Circus is a fantasy novel by best selling author Clive Barker.  It is composed of four interwoven stories penned by Clive Barker when he was in his early 20s in the Winter of 1974 that have never seen print in any form.   The book was published by Bad Moon Books in April 2009.

The book contains illustrations by Richard A. Kirk.  The book was printed in limited quantities.

Editions
This book was available in four different editions.  All editions were signed by Clive Barker.
"Trade Edition" of 1500 hardcover copies
"Slipcased Limited Edition" of 300 numbered copies
"Traycased Lettered Edition" of 26 signed and lettered copies
"Ultra Edition" of 10 handmade hardcovers

References

External links
Bad Moon Books official site

2009 British novels
Novels by Clive Barker